LED chandeliers are either normal chandeliers that have been retrofitted with LED bulbs, or contemporary designs that use light emitting diodes and acrylic or crystals.

The largest LED Chandelier is 65 feet long and 32 feet wide is in a shopping mall in Trinidad and Tobago.

References

External links
LED Lights Solution
Zoomable LED Display Lighting

Light fixtures
LED lamps